The Chemin des Canots River (rivière du Chemin des canots) is a tributary of the Malbaie River, flowing into the unorganized territory of Lac-Pikauba in the Charlevoix Regional County Municipality, in the Capitale-Nationale administrative region, in the province of Quebec, in Canada. The Chemin des Canots River crosses the eastern part of the Laurentides Wildlife Reserve; it flows into a river bend on the southwestern bank of the Malbaie River facing the zec des Martres.

The lower and middle parts of the Chemin des Canots River valley are served primarily by R0360 forest road and some other secondary forest roads, for forestry and recreational tourism purposes.

Forestry is the main economic activity of the sector; recreational tourism activities, second.

The surface of the Chemin des Canots River is usually frozen from early December to late March, however, safe ice circulation is generally from mid-December to mid-March.

Geography 
Canoeing can be practiced on this river for about ten kilometers; however, this river segment has only one portage to bypass the rapids between Lake Layrac and Canoe Lake. A canoe trip or by air can admire the summits of surrounding mountains named according to the main summits of the International Organization of the Francophonie:
 east side of the river: Moncton summit, from Hanoi, from Dakar, of Cotonou, of Paris, of Quebec;
 west side of the river: summit of Mauritius and Chaillot.

The main hydrographic slopes near the Chemin des Canots River are:
 north side: Creek des Vaches, Malbaie River, Froid Creek, Barley River, Ménard Lake, rivière à la Cruche;
 east side: Malbaie River, Barley River, Little Malbaie River;
 south side: Boisvert Lake, Enfers Lake, Hell River, Malbaie River;
 West side: Vents Lake, Raymond Lake, Hallebarde Lake, River at Mars.

The Canots River River rises at the mouth of a mountain stream at:
  northeast of Stymphale Lake;
  north-east of a curve of the course of the river at Mars;
  west of the Malbaie River;
  southeast of Cinto Lake;
  northwest of the confluence of the Rivière des Canots and Rivière Malbaie.

From its source (Pimpant Lake), the Chemin des Canots River descends on  entirely in forest and mountainous areas, with a difference of  depending on the segments following:
  northeasterly down the mountain, then southeast, to a river bend corresponding to a creek (coming from the north);
Note: Lake Bernard receives on the west side the waters of a group of lakes, including Gautreau Lake;
  to the south by collecting the dump (coming from the east) of Creux Lake and Lac de la Panetière, by cutting the forest road R0360, crossing Lake Layrac on its full length and crossing Canoe Lake, to its mouth. Note: Lake Canoes receives the discharge (from the east) of a set of lakes (Liette, Fagots, Grouse, Oread, Raymond, Wind and Halberd);
  north-east across Lake Robitaille, collecting the dump (coming from the south) of Bondy Lake and the dump ( from the south) of the Jeune Otter lake, to its mouth.

The Chemin des Canots River flows on the west bank of the Malbaie River downstream of a river curve and a rapids area. This confluence is located at:

  east of Assigny Lake which is part of the lake chain supplying the Chemin des Canots River;
  northwest of the confluence of Little Malbaie River and Malbaie River;
  west of Petite Malbaie River;
  south-west of lac des Martres;
  southwest of the confluence of the Malbaie River and the St. Lawrence River.

See also 
 Charlevoix Regional County Municipality
 Lac-Pikauba, a TNO
 Laurentides Wildlife Reserve
 Zec des Martres, a controlled harvesting zone
 Malbaie River
 St. Lawrence River
 List of rivers of Quebec

References

Rivers of Capitale-Nationale
Charlevoix Regional County Municipality
Laurentides Wildlife Reserve